Doordarshan Coimbatore was inaugurated on 14 April 1975. The service has been extended to the entire state in phased manner by installing terrestrial transmitters of different capacities (HPTs, LPTs, VLPTs) at different parts of the state.

DD Coimbatore is in western Tamil Nadu and also used for narrowcasting the Tamil Nadu Agricultural University in collaboration with Doordarshan Kendra, Coimbatore has recently Started the "Narrow casting of agricultural programmes through LPT" for the benefit of farmers and general public in and around Coimbatore district.

The local service caters to the needs of the populace living in the areas falling within the reach of a particular transmitter through area specific programmes in the local languages and dialects.

External links 
 

Doordarshan
Television channels and stations established in 1975
Indian direct broadcast satellite services
Mass media in Coimbatore